4:13 Dream is the thirteenth studio album by English rock band the Cure, released on 27 October 2008 by Suretone and Geffen Records. The album was preceded by four singles.

Production 
The thirteenth studio album by the Cure was originally intended to be a double album; however, frontman Robert Smith confirmed in interviews that this idea was scrapped, despite the fact that 33 songs had been recorded. Therefore, at least 20 additional songs were recorded for the album that did not make the final cut, with four being used for B-sides.

Smith has said, "Compiling a single CD album required a different approach (for one thing there was no longer the time to 'spread out' and connect the different moods as I had originally intended) and as a consequence a number of (my favorite!) slower songs and instrumental pieces were left unfinished and unreleased." Smith attested that the album would mostly comprise the upbeat songs the band recorded, while the darker songs may be released on another album.

Some songs featured on the album were recycled demos from earlier album sessions. One from the 1990s and two from the 1980s, including "Sleep When I'm Dead", which was originally written for the 1985 album The Head on the Door.

Smith co-produced the album with the assistance of Keith Uddin. Apart from the four band members and Uddin, no one was allowed in the recording sessions, in order to limit distractions. Smith said the band no longer screamed at each other over disagreements and that "The feeling in the studio [was] electric ...".

Promotion 
On 6 October 2007, the Cure played the first song from the upcoming album, "The Only One" (then titled "Please Project") at the Download Festival in Mountain View, California as part of their 4Tour. Following this, the band slowly introduced other songs from the album. In order to finish recording 4:13 Dream by early 2008, they delayed their North American tour by eight months. Later in the tour, the band performed the songs "Underneath the Stars", "The Perfect Boy", "Sleep When I'm Dead", "Freakshow" (then titled "Don't Say Anything"), "The Only One" (then titled "Please Project") and "It's Over" (then titled "Baby Rag Dog Book") at various shows. Although rumored to appear on the album from early reports, another song, "A Boy I Never Knew", was omitted from the final track listing.

On 1 May 2008, the Cure posted a bulletin on their MySpace page saying that the thirteenth day of each month leading up to the release of the album (May, June, July and August) would see the release of a single, including a B-side from the album recording session that would not make the final cut.  The four outtakes used were:  "NY Trip", "All Kinds of Stuff", "Down Under" and "Without You".

The first single, "The Only One", was released on 13 May, followed by "Freakshow" on 13 June, "Sleep When I'm Dead" on 13 July and "The Perfect Boy" on 13 August.

On 21 August the title of the album was announced online as 4.13 Dream, corrected three days later to 4:13 Dream. The official track listing was first revealed on the band's official website on 15 September.

Smith also mentioned the "dark album" companion piece, and jokingly stated that he would like to have it released by his next birthday (21 April 2009).

On 11 October, the Cure performed 4:13 Dream in its entirety at a free performance in the Piazza San Giovanni in Rome that was recorded for the MTV Live concert series. The album's release date was delayed yet again, and was ultimately released on 27 October.

Release 
On 1 May 2008, the Cure posted a bulletin on their MySpace page in which they confirmed that the album would be released on 13 September.

On 16 July, Robert Smith announced that the album's release date would be pushed back to 13 October, and in September's place, an EP was released, entitled Hypnagogic States, containing remixes of the four singles from 4:13 Dream.

4:13 Dream was released on 28 October 2008. It debuted at No. 16 on the Billboard 200, selling about 24,000 copies in its first week of release.

Critical reception 

4:13 Dream a score of 69 out of 100 from Metacritic based on "generally favorable reviews". While NME that had awarded the band with the godlike genius title earlier that year, then praised the album in their review as a quintessential Cure record, other journalists criticised the album's production, and its overly comfortable, and lightweight, songwriting.

Post release
In April 2014, Smith announced that the band would release an album called 4:14 Scream later that year, which would contain 14 of the outtakes from the 2007 recording sessions. Additionally, a limited-edition double album titled 4:26 Dream was also mooted, which would contain 26 non-album songs and/or remixes. To date, these albums of outtakes remain unreleased.

An official remix of "It's Over" by Smith, the "Whisper Mix", appears on the 2018 release of Torn Down.

Track listing

Personnel 
The Cure
 Robert Smith – vocals, guitar, six-string bass, keyboards, producer, mixing, engineering
 Porl Thompson – guitar
 Simon Gallup – bass
 Jason Cooper – drums, percussion, loops

Additional musicians
 Smud – extra percussion
 Catsfield Sub Rhythm Trio – handclaps

Production
 Keith Uddin – producer, mixing, engineering
 Matt Hendry – assistant engineer
 Simon Wakeling – assistant engineer
 Daren Butler – studio assistant
 Brian Gardner – mastering

Charts

Certifications and sales

References

2008 albums
The Cure albums
Geffen Records albums